Pauline Couriard (1848 in Saint Petersburg – 1898 in Saint Petersburg), born Pelageia Petrovna Vokhina, was a Russian painter, an honorary member of the Imperial Academy of Arts. She is best known for founding and chairing the First Ladies Art Circle in Saint Petersburg. She exhibited her artworks throughout Europe.

Life and work 
Pelageia Vokhina was born in 1848 in Saint Petersburg in an old nobility family. Her father, Piotr Vokhin, was a general in the Russian army. She was educated under the guidance of a popular artist Lev Lagorio. She exhibited for the first time at the age of 28 and it was a success.

Vokhina married a Swiss doctor Alfred Couriard, who worked in Mariinski hospital in Saint Petersburg and took his family name. Several years preceding her husband’s death Couriard was living in Geneve. She exhibited her landscapes at the Imperial Academy of Arts, where she received 2 silver medals, and in 1882 was recognized as an honorary member of the Imperial Academy of Arts.

In 1882 Couriard returned to Saint Petersburg. The same year she founded the First Ladies Art Circle aimed to facilitate women’s access to the courses provided by the Academy of Fine Arts. She chaired the First Ladies Art Circle for more than ten years. In 1892 on the occasion of tenth anniversary of the First Ladies Art Circle Couriard received a series of drawings as a gift from the members of the Circle. Geneve museum bequested these drawings in 1899. The drawings donated by Pauline Couriard were featured in the exhibition Russian painters and travelers of 19th century at the Museum of Art and History in Geneva in 2008-2009.

Pauline Couriard died in 1898 in Saint Petersburg.

Examples of works

References 

1848 births
1898 deaths
Russian painters
Russian women painters
19th-century painters from the Russian Empire